This page lists statistics from the 2003 season of the Albirex Niigata football team.

Competitions

Domestic results

J. League 2

Emperor's Cup

Player statistics

Other pages
 J. League official site

Albirex Niigata
Albirex Niigata seasons